Raszków  is a town in Ostrów Wielkopolski County, Greater Poland Voivodeship, Poland, with 2,043 inhabitants (2004).

Notable residents

Berthold Kempinski (1843-1910), German hotelier
Anna Jasińska (1867-1957), Polish activist
 (1888-1940), Polish gynaecologist, military officer, victim of the Katyn massacre during World War II
 (1921-2009), Polish artist, scenic designer, prisoner of Nazi German concentration camps during World War II
 (born 1995), Polish cyclist

Cities and towns in Greater Poland Voivodeship
Ostrów Wielkopolski County